Istorifik: Pidol's Kuwentong Fantastik (formerly known as Pidol's Wonderland) was a weekly fantasy, comedy series in which it delivers stories for the family as told by Dolphy as the character Mang Pidol. It airs on TV5 every Sunday at 6:30 PM.

Pidol's Wonderland dramatizes, adapts, and retells folk tales and legends, as well as original tall tales and fantasy stories.

Due to the hospital confinement of Dolphy in 2011, until his death in 2012, Pidol's Wonderland was reformatted as a fantasy anthology.

Plot
A curio shop owner in downtown Manila, Mang Pidol brings in the comedy together with his sons Bart (Vandolph Quizon) and Panyong (Epi Quizon), his daughter-in-law Jenny, and Baby VJ, his granddaughter.

The shop is where Mang Pidol's animated storytelling sessions are usually attended by a motley group of common folks in the neighborhood — the barbers Samson (Brod Pete) and Adonis (Long Mejia), the bakery owner Brigit (Joy Viado) and her assistant, Lyla (Arianna Barouk).

Pilot episode

Summary
Mang Pidol, an antique shop owner, tells his family the story of twin brothers—one extremely dark and homely named Calderon, the other fair and attractive named Iñigo—whose Caucasian father William abandoned them and their mother Blanca due to doubtful parentage, leaving the family in dire financial straits. When the ruler of their realm, King Claudio, invites the male inhabitants of the kingdom to enter into contests of skill and strength for the hand of his daughter, the Princess Vanessa, the twins resolve to join. But even though he wins the contests hands-down, Calderon is forsaken because of his less-than-desirable looks. A mysterious stranger bequeaths to Calderon a magic lantern that transforms him into the dashing contender Calano, but questions about his identity put Calderon's possible victory and the love of the beautiful princess in jeopardy.

Casts and characters

Main cast
Dolphy as Mang Pidol
Vandolph as Bart
Epi Quizon as Panyong Epifanio
Jenny Quizon as Jenny
Long Mejia as Adonis
Brod Pete as Samson
Joy Viado as Brigit
Mar Lopez as Mang Mar the Minstrel
Elijah Alejo as Baby V
Ariana Barouk as Lyla

Episode/guest cast
Jay Aquitania
Ritz Azul
Ahron Villena
Ara Mina
Alex Gonzaga
Karel Marquez
Danita Paner
Arci Muñoz
Martin Escudero
Jasmine Curtis-Smith
Francis Magundayao
Julian Marcus Trono
Valeen Montenegro
JC De Vera

TV specials

On July 15, 2012, the day of Dolphy's funeral, a TV special of Pidol's Wonderland  remembering the King of Comedy was aired, hosted by Vic Sotto.

See also
List of programs aired by TV5 (Philippine TV network)

References

External links
 

TV5 (Philippine TV network) original programming
2010 Philippine television series debuts
2013 Philippine television series endings
Philippine comedy television series
Filipino-language television shows